The first season of the musical drama television series Soy Luna premiered on Disney Channel Latin America on March 14, 2016, and concluded on May 6, 2016. This season consists of 80 episodes, divided in two parts of 40 episodes each. The show was broadcast from Monday to Friday at 6:00pm Argentine time.

It stars Karol Sevilla as Luna Valente — A teenager with great talent in music and in skating who wants to become a world star, with Ruggero Pasquarelli, Valentina Zenere, and Michael Ronda as the titular characters.

The season recorded a total of 2.3 million viewers and in its last episode of the season a total of 5.3 million viewers, becoming the most watched Disney Channel show.

The first season of the series was made available on Netflix on March 1, 2017. However, on January 1, 2020, the season was re-released on Disney +, being fully removed from Netflix on May 1, 2020.

Plot summary 
Luna Valente (Karol Sevilla) is happy for the life above her skates. Just like any girl her age, she lives with her family, goes to school and has her group of friends. In addition, she has a job as a distributor at a fast food restaurant. Luna spends most of her time skating by the sea and listening to the songs composed by her best friend, Simón Álvarez (Michael Ronda). Her life takes an unexpected turn when her parents receive a proposal impossible to refuse: overnight, the Valente family must leave their beloved home and move to another country. Luna must adapt to a new life, new friends and a new school, where she finds a world of luxury and elite that she has little to do with. Luna takes refuge in her skates and, thanks to them, discovers a track of skating that offers a new universe on wheels.

Cast

Starring 
 Karol Sevilla as Luna Valente 
 Ruggero Pasquarelli as Matteo Balsano
 Valentina Zenere as Ámbar Smith 
 Michael Ronda as Simón Álvarez
 Malena Ratner as Delfina "Delfi" Alzamendi
 Agustín Bernasconi as Gastón Perida
 Katja Martínez as Jazmín Carbajal
 Ana Jara as Jimena "Jim" Medina
 Jorge López as Ramiro Ponce
 Chiara Parravicini as Yamila "Yam" Sánchez
 Gastón Vietto as Pedro Arias 
 Lionel "Leo" Ferro as Nicolás "Nico" Navarro
 Carolina Kopelioff as Nina Simonetti

Also starring 
 Luz Cipriota as Tamara Ríos
 Lucila Gandolfo as Sharon Benson
 Rodrigo Pedreira as Reinaldo "Rey" Guitierrez
 David Murí as Miguel Valente
 Ana Carolina Valsagna as Mónica Valente
 Diego Sassi Alcalá as Tino
 Germán Tripel as Cato
 Antonella Querzoli as Amanda
 Paula Kohan as Mora Barza
 Ezequiel Rodríguez as Ricardo Simonetti
 Caro Ibarra as Ana Castro

Recurring 
 Sol Moreno as Daniela
 Tomás de las Heras as Mariano
 Thelma Fardin as Flor
 Gabriel Calamari as Xavi
 Samuel Do Nascimento as Santi Owen

Special guest stars 
 Santiago Stieben as Arcade
 Sebastian Villalobos as himself
 Dani Martins as himself
 Sofia Carson as herself
 Mirta Wons as Olga
 Leo Trento as Willy Star

Episodes

References 

2016 Argentine television seasons